The white-naped lory (Lorius albidinucha) is a monotypic species of parrot in the family Psittaculidae.

Description
It is mostly red with black on top of head and white on back of neck. It has green wings, and a narrow yellow transverse line on each side of body below neck. It has dark-grey legs. It has an orange-red beak, dark-grey eyerings, and orange-yellow pupils.

Distribution and habitat
It is endemic to central and southern New Ireland in Papua New Guinea. Its natural habitats are subtropical or tropical moist lowland forest and subtropical or tropical moist montane forest. It is threatened by habitat loss.

References

Cited texts
 

Lorius
Birds of New Ireland Province
Birds described in 1924
Taxonomy articles created by Polbot